Pobjie is a surname, popular in Australia. Notable people with the surname include:

 Kevin Pobjie, former Australian professional rugby league player
 Michael Pobjie (born 1961), former Australian professional rugby league player
Ben Pobjie, Australian writer and comedian. As of 25/08/18 he works for the ABC

pobjee